The Archdiocese of Amalfi-Cava de' Tirreni is an archdiocese of the Latin Church of the Catholic Church, with its episcopal see at Amalfi, not far from Naples. It was named Archdiocese of Amalfi until parts of the Diocese of Cava e Sarno were merged with it on September 30, 1986.

It was exempt, i.e. directly dependent on the Holy See, but is now a suffragan of the Roman Catholic Archdiocese of Salerno-Campagna-Acerno.

The current bishop is Orazio Soricelli.  In 2015, in the diocese of Amalfi there was one priest for every 1,199 Catholics.

Special churches 
Amalfi Cathedral, the cathedral archiepiscopal see, is in Amalfi, devoted to Andrew the Apostle.
It also has 
 Marian Co-Cathedral dedicated to the Visitation, in Cava de’ Tirreni
 Former Cathedral, a marian Minor Basilica, dedicated to the Assumption of Mary and to St. Pantaleone, in Ravello
 Former Cathedral, also Minor Basilica, dedicated to St. Trofimena, in Minori
 Former Cathedral of St. Lawrence 'Duomo di S. Lorenzo', in Scala, Campania
 Minor Basilica of Santa Maria dell’Olmo, in Cava de’ Tirreni

History 
The early beginnings of the Diocese of Amalfi are obscure; it is not known when it was founded, or when Christianity reached it. That it was early is a reasonable conjecture, considering the facilities for communication with the East which the South of Italy possessed.

The first indication that Amalfi was a Christian community is supplied by Pope Gregory the Great, who wrote in January 596 to the Subdeacon Antemius, his legate and administrator in Campania, ordering him to constrain within a monastery Primenus, Bishop of Amalfi, because he did not remain in his diocese, but roamed about. The regular list of bishops began in 829.

It was raised to Metropolitan Archbishopric of Amalfi by Pope John XV in 987, having lost territory to establish the dioceses of Capri, of Lettere, of Minori and of Scala.

In 1206, it gained territory from the suppressed Roman Catholic Diocese of Nuceria. And after the completion, also in 1206, of the Cathedral of St. Andrew (Duomo), the relics of the Apostle of that name, who was the patron saint of Amalfi, were taken from Constantinople and brought there by Cardinal Pietro of Capua, an Amalfitan who took part in the sack of Constantinople during the Fourth Crusade.

On 10 October 1384 it lost territory to establish the Diocese of Nuceria

On 27 June 1818 it lost its status as a metropolitan archdiocese and became the Archdiocese of Amalfi, despite having gained territories from the suppressed dioceses of Minori and of Ravello and Scala.

In the early 20th century, archdiocese had about 36,000 inhabitants, 54 parishes and 279 diocesan priests.

On 30 September 1986 the diocese was renamed the "Archdiocese of Amalfi–Cava de’ Tirreni", having gained territory from and absorbing the title of the suppressed Roman Catholic Diocese of Cava de’ Tirreni.

On 20 August 2012 it gained territory from the Territorial Abbey of Santissima Trinità di Cava de Tirreni.

Bishops and archbishops

Diocese of Amalfi
Erected: 6th Century
Latin Name: Amalphitana

...
 Pimenius (596)
...
 Petrus (879)
 Orso (897–920)
 Giacinto (925 – 936?)
 Costantino (947–960)
 Mastalo (960 – 987?)

Archdiocese of Amalfi
Elevated: 987
Latin Name: Amalphitana

to 1200

 Leo (Leone Orso Comite) (987–1029)
 Leone (1029–1050)
 Pietro Alferio (1050 – 1070?)
 Giovanni (1070–1082)
 Sergio Donnamira (1082–1102)
 Mauro De Monte (1103–1128) 
Giovanni della Porta (ca. 1130–1142)
 Giovanni (1142–1166)
 Giovanni di San Paolo (1166–1168)
 Roboaldo (1168–1174)
 Dionisio (1174–1202)

1200 to 1400

 Matteo Capuano (1202–1215)
 Giovanni Capuano (1215–1239)
 Bartolomeo Pignatelli (1254 – 1254.11.04)
 Gualtiero de’ Gualtieri (1254.11.10 – 1258)
 Filippo Augustariccio (1258 – 1291?)
 Andrea d’Alagno (1295–1330)
 Landolfo Caracciolo, O.F.M. Conv.? (1331.09.20 – 1350?)
 Pietro Capuano (1351 – 1362?)
 Marino del Giudice (1361.04.16 – 1373.05.18
 Giovanni Acquaviva (1375.01.01 – 1378);
Bertrand Mormillis (7 February 1379 – 1385)  (appointed by Pope Clement VII of the Avignon Obedience)
Sergius Grisoni (1379–1392)   (appointed by Urban VI of the Roman Obedience).
Nicolaus de Sora (1385–1393)  (appointed by Boniface IX of the Roman Obedience).
Paulus de Surrento (1393–1401) (appointed by Boniface IX of the Roman Obedience).

1400 to 1600

Bertrandus de Alaneo (1401–1412) (appointed by Boniface IX of the Roman Obedience).
Robertus de Branchea (1413–1423)  (appointed by John XXIII of the Avignon-Roman-Pisan Obedience).
Andrea de Palearea (28 June 1424 – 1449) (appointed by Pope Martin V, elected by the Cardinals and others at the Council of Constance).
 Antonio Carlini, O.P. (1449–1460 Died)
 Nicolaus Miroballo (1460–1472 Died)
Sede vacante
 Giovanni Nicolini (1475–1482 Resigned)
Battista dei Giudici (1482–1484 Translated)
 Andrea de Conto (Cuncto) (1484–1503 Died)
 Tommaso Regolano (1504–1510 Died)
 Antonio Balestrieri, O. Cist. (1513–1516 Resigned)
Lorenzo Pucci, Administrator (1516–1517 Resigned)
 Girolamo de Plancha (17 June 1517 – 1519)
Girolamo Ghianderoni (6 June 1519 – 1530)  (Appointed, Bishop of Massa Marittima)
Ferdinando D'Anna (1530–1541 Appointed, Archbishop (Personal Title) of Bovino)
Alfonso Oliva, O.S.A. (1541–1544 Died)
Francesco Sfondrati (1544–1547 Appointed, Archbishop (Personal Title) of Capaccio)
Tiberio Crispo (1547–1561 Resigned)
Massimo de' Massimi (1561–1564 Resigned)
Tiberio Crispo (1564–1565 Resigned)
Marco Antonio Bozzuto (1565–1570 Died)
Carlo Montigli (1570–1576 Appointed, Archbishop (Personal Title) of Viterbo e Tuscania)
Giulio Rossino (1576–1616 Died)

1600 to 1818

Paolo Emilio Filonardi (1616–1624 Died)
Giacomo Theodoli (Teodolo) (1625–1635 Appointed, Archbishop (Personal Title) of Forlì)
Matteo Granito (1635–1638 Died)
Angelo Pichi (Pico) (1638–1648 Appointed, Archbishop (Personal Title) of San Miniato)
Stefano Quaranta, C.R. (1649–1678 Died)
Gaetano Miraballi (Miroballi), C.R. (1679–1681 Died)
Simplicio Caravita, O.S.B. (1682–1701 Died)
Michele de Bologna, C.R.(1701–1731 Died)
Pietro Agostino Scorza (Scortia) (1731–1748 Resigned)
Nicola Cioffi) (1748–1758 Died)
Antonio Puoti) (1758–1792 Died)
Silvestro Miccù,  O.F.M.Obs., (1804–1830 Died)

Since 1818
Territory Added: 1818	from the suppressed Diocese of Minori
Territory Added: 1818	from  the suppressed Diocese of Scala

Mariano Bianco (1831–1848 Retired)
Domenico Ventura (1849–1862 Died)
Francesco Antonio Maiorsini (1871–1893 Died)
Enrico de Dominis (Dominicis) (1894–1908 Died)
Antonio Maria Bonito (1908–1910 Resigned)
Angelo Maria Dolci (1911–1914 Appointed, Titular Archbishop of Hierapolis in Syria)
Ercolano Marini (1915–1945 Retired)
Luigi Martinelli (1946–1946 Died)
Angelo Rossini (1947–1965 Died)
Alfredo Vozzi (1972–1982 Retired)
Ferdinando Palatucci (1982–1990 Retired)

Archdiocese of Amalfi-Cava de' Tirreni
United on 30 September 1986 with the Diocese of Cava e Sarno

Beniamino Depalma, C.M. (1990–1999 Appointed, Archbishop (Personal Title) of Nola)
Orazio Soricelli (2000–)

References

Sources   
  pp. 84–85. (in Latin)
 p. 86. (in Latin)
 p. 80.  (in Latin)
 (in Latin)
 (in Latin)
 (in Latin)

 Kehr, Paulus Fridolinus (1935). Italia pontificia.  Vol. VIII:  Regnum Normannorum—Campania Berlin: Weidmann.  (in Latin)

External links 
 
 
 Archdiocese of Amalfi at GCatholic.org

Amalfi-Cava Tirreni
Amalfi Coast
Cava de' Tirreni